Adaalat is an Indian television courtroom drama anthology series about a defence attorney, K.D. Pathak, portrayed by Ronit Roy. First season of the show premiered on Sony on 20 November 2010 and ran for five years, ending on 11 July 2015. The series based events is produced by Contiloe Entertainment and stars Ronit Roy in the protagonist role. The show aired 431 episodes in its first season.

Adaalat returned for its second season on SET on 4 June 2016 and ended on 4 September 2016. The show aired 26 episodes in its second season.

Plot 
Adaalat is a show revolving around K.D. Pathak (Ronit Roy), a suave, sophisticated, witty and yet unconventional lawyer. He can get his clients out of the tightest of situations. His success rate of acquittals is 100 percent. But most importantly K.D. stands not for his client, but for Justice. K.D. has an amazing eye for detail and an insatiable thirst for knowledge. He always seems to know enough about every profession, and what he doesn't know he covers up/makes up with his smartness. He is a quick thinker. K.D. steps into a case when all is doomed for the accused. All the doors are shut. When the prosecution has prepared a water tight open and shut case where even a blind man can tell that the accused is guilty then K.D. somehow performs a miracle. No one can see the case from the angle K.D. does. He digs fervently for loopholes in the prosecution's case much to their frustration and thinking on his feet, he manages to turn the entire case around. Often through histrionics, magical gimmicks (since he has recently started learning magic and uses a parallel between magic and justice that often what we see is not all there is something beyond it), performances, which the Judge does not approve of ! And nor does his ex-love Maya (The Prosecutor who is often at the receiving end!) – But that is K.D. unstoppable, incorrigible and completely enthralling and entertaining. The prosecutor will always leave broken-hearted with this man.

Seasons

Episode List

Season 01

Season 02

Cast

Main 

 Ronit Roy as Advocate K.D. Pathak (full form Karanveer Diwakar Pathak)
 Romit Raj as Varun Zaveri, K.D.'s Assistant 
 Shraman Jain as Shraman, K.D.'s Assistant
 Prerna Wanvari as Sunaina, K.D.'s Assistant
 Sunayna Fozdar as Niyati Sharma, K.D.'s Assistant
 Tithi Raaj as Adhira, K.D.'s Assistant
 Niloufer as Mrs. Billimoria, K.D.'s Secretary
 Ajay Kumar Nain as Inspector Shrikant Dave

Recurring 

 Anand Goradia in a double role as Public Prosecutor Inder Mohan Jaiswal and as Yash Mohan Jaiswal
 Mushtaq Khan as Jhilmil Zaveri
 Raja Chaudhary as Inspector Suraj Rathore
 Tina Choudhary as Advocate Maya Phadnis
 Ami Trivedi as Advocate Urmi Dixit
 Shikha Singh as Advocate Anjali Puri
 Sayantani Ghosh as Advocate Pranali Gujral
 Tarun Khanna as Advocate Sudhanshu Jog/Tejas Yadav/Arjun Yadav
 Vaibhavi Upadhyay as Advocate Rubina Khan
 Sheetal Maulik as Advocate Disha
 Aman Mittal as Judge
 Iqbal Azad as Advocate Manoj Kumar
 Pratik Dixit as Judge Vishwas
 Kushal Punjabi as Rehan Khan/Advocate Tarun Bakshi
 Gaurav Chopra as  Advocate Vishwajeet Ranawat
 Shweta Kawatra as Advocate Surveen Khurana
 Aashka Goradia as Advocate Meera Thakur 
 Vinay Apte as Advocate Meghraj Rane
 Sweta Keswani as Advocate Aarti Keswani
 Karishma Tanna as Advocate Anushka Jaffery
 Rakshanda Khan as Advocate Pratigya Verma
 Ali Merchant as Advocate Akram Khan
 Manini Mishra as Public Prosecutor Devyani Bose
 Pramod Moutho as Advocate Tukaram Avatramani
 Suchitra Pillai as Public Prosecutor Maya Srivastav
 Aashish Kaul as Advocate Rajveer Rathore
 Tushar Dalvi as Advocate Rajnath Salgaonkar
 Rajesh Puri as Public Prosecutor Pramod Jha
 Vishnu Sharma as Public Prosecutor Jaydeep Thakral
Nagesh Bhonsle as Public Prosecutor Sharad Bhonsle
 Rajesh Puri as Public Prosecutor Viren Prajapati
 Geetanjali Tikekar as Public Prosecutor Suchitra Silwadker
 Sudha Chandran as Public Prosecutor Indrani Singh
 Karishma Modi as Advocate Anita D' Souza
Rukhsar Rehman as Advocate Rukhsar Rehman
 Ravee Gupta as Public Prosecutor Mitali Basu
 Raj Singh as Public Prosecutor Tarun Mehta
 Achyut Potdar as Judge Ashutosh Manchandani
 Chand Dhar as Judge Chand Kumar Hingorani
 Pradeep Shukla as Judge Rishabh Dhingra
 Ajit Mehra as Judge Naresh Chaudhary
 Rakesh Kukreti as Dhiren Shah
 Navina Bole as Mrs. Dhiren Shah
 Surabhi Prabhu as Maya
 Karmveer Choudhary as Sarpanch
 Sukesh Anand as Mr. Majumdar
 Naresh Suri as Judge Manitosh Vohra
 Azaan Rustam Shah as Bunty
 Kishwer Merchant as Devika, News Presenter (Season 02)

Episodic appearances 

 Shivaji Satam as ACP Pradyuman from CID
Aditya Srivastava as Senior Inspector Abhijeet from CID
Dayanand Shetty as Senior Inspector Daya from CID
Dinesh Phadnis as Inspector Fredricks from CID
Narendra Gupta as Dr. Salunkhe from CID
Shraddha Musale as Dr. Tarika from CID
Janvi Chheda as Sub-Inspector Shreya from CID
Ansha Sayed as Sub-Inspector Purvi from CID
Vikas Salgotra as Sub-Inspector Mayur from CID
 Shahab Khan as Shyamchand Shrivastava 
 Darshan Jariwala as Karanveer Shekhawat/Mr. Karnal
 Manav Gohil as Abhinav Shekhawat
 Maya Alagh as Damyanti Shekhawat
 Nandini Singh as Meghla Gupta/Kavya/Sukanya Amrish Goel/ Madhura Shroff
 Shahab Khan as Shyamchand Shrivastava 
 Manish Goel as Brijesh Rana
 Abir Goswami as Amrit Nagpal
 Eijaz Khan as Anurag Sirohi/Virat
 Rucha Gujarathi as Kajal Bhandari
 Sai Deodhar as Advocate Soundarya Sharma
 Rohit Purohit as Marco D'Souza
 Arun Bakshi as Judge Chandrakant Sareen
 Vindu Dara Singh as Sanjay Bhagat
 Shweta Tiwari as Revati Amrit Nagpal
 Ulka Gupta as Naina Dixit
 Chandan Madan as Anand Mishra (Episode-45)/Toofan (Episode-216 and 217)/Zavisco (Episode-152 and 153) and Divyakant Chatrumukhi (Episode-371)
 Govind Agarwal as Ranjit Das
 Zara Barring as Sheena Chauhan
 Gavie Chahal as Sunil Kamat
 Kushal Punjabi as Rehan Khan/Atul Paranjpe 
 Jaya Bhattacharya as Urja Seth
 Divyanka Tripathi Dahiya as Kumud Sharma/Flavia Gomes
 Gufi Paintal as Rattan Lal
 Kamalika Guha Thakurta as Saudamini Patel
 Puneet Vashisht as Goga/Nachiket
 Avtar Gill as Judge Brijnath Goyal
 Rahul Verma Rajput as Abhishek Singh Chaudhary
 Deepali Pansare as Mubina Khatun
 Rupali Ganguly as Public Prosecutor Rohini Mallik
 Vikas Kumar as Senior Inspector Damodar Deshmukh
 Lilliput as Brijesh Kumar (Babloo Joker)/Peter Fernandes
 Hunar Hali as Varsha Rai
 Aditya Kapadia as Mukul Srivastav
 Kajal Pisal as Anjali
 Tarun Khanna as Boxer Tejas Yadav
 Bhavna Roy as Emillie Gomes
Nirmal Soni as Prince Roody
 Sanjeev Tyagi as Dr. Subhankar Ghosh/Dr. Manish Jhanjhani
 Usha Poudel as Pooja Bhasin
 Navina Bole as Reena Singh
 Neha Janpandit as Varsha Mandge
 Aastha Chaudhary as Riya Malhotra/Nalini Rathore
 Suresh Chatwal as Kishan Chawla
 Bharti Singh as Aarti Sinha
 Vikas Anand as Chief Minister Arvind Rao/Jailor/Swami Durvansh
 Raju Shrestha as  Abhigyan Rohra/Jaggi Malhotra
 Nimisha Vakharia as Public Prosecutor Mrs. Thakkar
 Sharad Vyas as Judge Prasad Patil
 Chhavi Mittal as Dr. Amrita Bakshi
 Dr. Ved Thappar as  Public Prosecutor Vikas Pattanayak
 Mohit Malik as Ankur Lutra
 Manish Naggdev as Rahul Wadhwa
 Vaquar Shaikh as Chandrakant Kohli
 Anupam Bhattacharya as Habibul Mirza
 Neha Saxena as Dr. Shyamali Wadhera
 Salim Shah as Mr. Sodhi/Suhail Rizvi/Prof. Kailash Brahmabhatt
 Dolly Bindra as Sonali (Sweety) Manchanda
 Ashita Dhawan as Advocate Manjula Tripathi
 Raju Srivastav as Raju Chaurasia
 Yash Dasgupta as Sikander Khan/Viraj Anand
 Mihir Mishra as Bob Smith
 Mohan Kapoor as Dr. Prashant Suryavanshi
 Anurag Sharma as Abhay Damle
 Vineet Raina as Debojit Sarkar
 Pankaj Dheer as Dr. Bhaskaran Reddy
 Rushad Rana as Jamshed Jijibhoy
 Vishal Malhotra as DJ Swaroop
 Manit Joura as Sujit Gurumurthy
 Falaq Naaz as Maya/Rubiya Hassan
 Leena Jumani as Mihika Gada
 Amit Tandon as Public Prosecutor Rajiv Jain
 Arif Zakaria as Dr. Ashok Paranjpe
 Gajendra Chauhan as Colonel Vikram Desai
 Gulki Joshi as Advocate Swarna Sabnis
 Kurush Deboo as Marz Furniturewala
 Sachal Tyagi as Advocate Bharat Singh Bhardwaj
 Sarwar Ahuja as Santosh Pillai
 Ravi Jhankal as Jardan Singh Solanki/Nawal Kishore Shekhawat
 Amit Pachori as Bhaskar Chaubey
 Raj Premi as Dinkar Bhau
 Shishir Sharma as Public Prosecutor Vidyut Ranawat
 Jayshree Soni as Sanjana Acharya
 Santosh Shukla as Krishna
 Nidhi Jha as Anuradha Sinha
 Bhaskar Pandey as Monty
 Sanjay Swaraj as Dibakar Banerjee
 Ankit Arora as Bipin Khatri
 Amit Dolawat as  Chandan Singh/Ranveer Ranjha (RR)
 Sonal Parihar as Anjali Rajput
 Charu Asopa as Anjali Ranjha
 Pooran Kiri as Tiwari Seth
 Manish Khanna as Professor Pranay Dasgupta
 Mandar Jadhav as Abhijeet Malhotra
 Prakash Ramchandani as Kailash Awasthi/Sunil Khanna
 Anoop Gautam as Jatin Sardesai
 Shresth Kumar as Rajat Malhotra/Akshay Talwar
 Akshay Sethi as Joydeep/Gajendra
 Rishi Khurana as Bheema Sapru
 Shaleen Malhotra as Jamaal Ahmed
 Amit Behl as Professor Gajendra Mishra
 Simple Kaul as Renuka Niranjan Sahay/Sunaina Amber Agnihotri
 Rishika Mihani as Raashi Chopra
 Chestha Bhagat as Kirti Shah
 Shiva Rindani as Jayant Rao (Dinkar's Henchman)
 Saanand Verma as Chandu Deshmukh
 Prithvi Zutshi as Niranjan Sahay
 Sheetal Thakkar as Pooja Talwar
 Tiya Gandwani as Namita
 Parul Chaudhary as Isabelle Fernandes
 Monica Khanna as Riya Singh
 Rishina Kandhari as Shikha Singh (ATS Head)
 Alok Narula as Ankush Mehra
 Meghan Jadhav as Vicky Mehra
 Hemant Choudhary as Inspector Arvind Singh
 Shahrukh Sadri as Professor Kishore Dixit
 Kishore Pradhan as Yashwant Lohar
 Rishabh Shukla as Siddhant Gurjar
 Jatin Shah as Kunal Srivastava
 Manoj Verma as Sushant Malhotra
 Mayank Gandhi as Ranjeev Menon
 Bhanujeet Sudan as Sanjay Rathore
 Alex Gabriel as Kirk Tyler
 Kunal Bakshi as Jamshed Irani/Satish Tyagi
 Amreen Chakkiwala as Anju Thapar
 Chirag Desai as Vikram/Sathish Khemka
 Bakul Thakkar as Advocate Ashish Lahiri
 Rituraj Singh as Trikon
 Puru Chibber as Tara Singh
 Amit Dhawan as Vipul Sethi
 Malini Kapoor as Aditi Sethi
 Khushboo Tawde as Bindiya Mhatre
 Kishore Pradhan as Yashwant Lohar
 Sharhaan Singh as Aslam Khan
 Ishita Vyas as Rukmani/Meera Bhagat
 Rudra Kaushish as Nilesh Solanki
 Vishal Puri as Shadab Khan
 Abhinav Kapoor as Joy Sen
 Gopal Singh as Zorawar Ansari
 Vimarsh Roshan as Flight lieutenant Tarun Garg
 Sheetal Singh as Priya Bansal
 Aarti Rana as Manda Gada/Pavitra Mehta
 Vineet Kumar as Flight Lieutenant Ajeet Rana/Kishore Verma
 Priya Shinde as Meera
 Sarita Joshi as Kavita Joshi
 Shagufta Ali as Menka Sharma
 Kannan Arunachalam as Advocate Pachauri/Advocate Rao
 Sikandar Kharbanda as Public Prosecutor
 Pallavi Dutt in Episode 358
 Himanshu Soni as Aatish Patil in Episode 218 and 219
Rishabh Jain as Mr. Zubin

Special appearances 
Jackky Bhagnani
Jimmy Shergill
Ravi kumar bs

Guest appearances 
 Vijay Sethupathi
 Shiva
 Y. G. Mahendra

Crossover episodes 
"CID Officer Abhijeet Adaalat Mein" was the 3rd episode and 1st Special episode of Adaalat. In the episode CID Officer Abhijeet is accused of murdering a thief while taking him to Jail. It aired on both CID & Adaalat on 3 & 4 December 2010. KD Pathak takes up the case to defend Abhijeet to prove his innocence.

"CID Viruddh Adaalat" is the 137th episode & 2nd Special episode of the first season of the series. The episode was a crossover episode with CID. Originally aired on 15 July 2012, the episode was written by Arshad Sayed and director by Pawan Kaul. The principal photography of the episode was held in Mumbai, India and was commenced in June 2012. The episode received mixed to positive reviews from the viewers.
The episode is about Rohit's murder which takes place in DCP Samsher Singh Chitrole's (played by B. P. Singh) house, who gets arrested. The case then lands in KD Pathak's (played by Ronit Roy) hands in Adaalat, where he fights the case for DCP.

"CID Vs Adaalat – Karmyudh" is the 382nd episode and 3rd Special episode of Adaalat. The episode was a crossover episode between CID and Adaalat. Originally aired on 20 December 2014, the episode was written by Arshad Sayed and directed by Siba Mitra (director of Adaalat) and Raminder Suri (director of CID). The principal photography of the episode was held in different parts of Mumbai, India and was shot on the sets of both Adaalat and CID. The episode received mixed to positive reviews from the viewers.

Sequel 

The series returned with a second season which premiered on 4 June 2016 and is intended to be a mini-series of 26 episodes. Ronit Roy stars in the lead role and Tisca Chopra, Anand Goradia, Rakshanda Khan, Gaurav Chopra and Pankaj B. Singh star in recurring roles.

Notes

References

External links 

 

Sony Entertainment Television original programming
Indian drama television series
Courtroom drama television series
Indian legal television series
2010 Indian television series debuts
2016 Indian television series endings